Megachile umbripennis is a species of bee in the family Megachilidae. It was described by Smith in 1853. M. umbrippenis is named for its characteristic dark wings. The species is found in southern Asia, various pacific islands, and the eastern coast of the United States.

References

Umbripennis
Insects described in 1853